is a Japanese TV comedian, presenter, tarento, and musician, represented by Yoshimoto Kogyo. He is the chairman of the comedy troupe  and drummer for the band Genie High.

Koyabu graduated as the 12th generation class from Yoshimoto NSC Osaka and speaks with an Osaka dialect.

Media

Television

Current Programs 
  (MBS TV)
  (ABCTV) – Regular
  (Yomiuri TV) – Semi-regular
 BAZOOKA!!! (BS SKP, 2011–) – MC
  (Fuji TV, 2012–) – Bi-weekly (Tuesdays)
  (Fuji TV ONE, 2013–) – MC
  (MBS TV) – Semi-regular (Fridays)
  (TV Asahi) – Irregular
  (Fuji TV ONE, 2015–)
  (Fuji TV ONE, 2017–) – MC
  (Kansai TV, 2017–) – MC
  (TV Asahi, 2019–) – MC
  (NHK, 2015–)
 HINABINGO! (Nippon TV, 2019–) – MC
  (Fuji TV, 2019–) – MC

Film 
Girl in the Sunny Place (2013), Sugihara
A Man (2022)

Television drama 
Rikuoh (2017), Junji Sayama
Kirin ga Kuru (2020–21), Nijō Haruyoshi

References

External links 
 Yoshimoto Kogyo Official Profile
 Kazutoyo Koyabu – Blog
 Kazutoyo Koyabu (@koyabukazutoyo) – Twitter
 Kazutoyo Koyabu (@koyabukazutoyo_shingigeki) – Instagram

Japanese comedians
Japanese television presenters
People from Osaka
1973 births
Living people